This is a list of episodes for the Televisa telenovela A que no me dejas.

Series overview

Episodes

Season 1 (2015–16)

References 

A que no me dejas
A que no me dejas episodes